MBCI may refer to:

Mennonite Brethren Collegiate Institute
Mississippi Band of Choctaw Indians